Arzuman is an Armenian male first name. It is derived from the Persian word "Arzumand", meaning "nostalgia", "well-wisher", "hoping". The name has received a special distribution among Armenians in Nagorno-Karabakh. The name of Arzuman is a formative word of the Armenian surname Arzumanyan.

Notes

Armenian masculine given names
Armenian names